Krzysztof Walczak (born 4 February 1963) is a retired Polish football striker. Besides Poland, he played in Cyprus.

References

1963 births
Living people
Polish footballers
Ruch Chorzów players
Polonia Bytom players
Śląsk Wrocław players
GKS Katowice players
Nea Salamis Famagusta FC players
Association football forwards
Polish expatriate footballers
Expatriate footballers in Cyprus
Polish expatriate sportspeople in Cyprus
People from Świętochłowice